Tre Barry (born 13 March 1996) is a Bahamian footballer who plays for the Bahamas national football team.

International career
Barry made his senior international debut on 12 October 2018 in a 6–0 defeat to Antigua and Barbuda in CONCACAF Nations League qualifying.

References

External links

1996 births
Living people
Bahamian footballers
Bahamas international footballers
Association football defenders